José Alfredo González Tahuilán (born 10 April 1980 in Mexico City) is a Mexican former footballer. He last played as a defender for Atlético San Luis.

Career
Gonzalez Tahuilan made his professional debut with FC America on 15 August 1999 against Toros Neza with a score of 2–0 in favor of America. Tahuilan has already been in several teams in the first division of Mexican soccer, such as: America, St. Louis, Detroit, Atlas and currently plays for Xoloitzcuintles of Tijuana. Its main virtue is the air game.

Championships

Tijuana
Liga MX (1):2012–13 Season 2012

America
2 times with  Club America

San Luis
1 subchampionship with San Luis FC

References

1980 births
Living people
Footballers from Mexico City
Mexican footballers
Association football defenders
Club América footballers
San Luis F.C. players
Tigres UANL footballers
Club Tijuana footballers
Liga MX players
Indigenous Mexicans